Solero may refer to:
Solero (ice cream), an ice cream brand
Solero, Piedmont, a comune (municipality) in the province of Alessandria in the Italian region Piedmont

See also
 Soltero (disambiguation)
 Soulero (disambiguation)